The 2020 Match Premier Cup was third edition of Match Premier Cup, a friendly association football tournament played in the Qatar.

Teams

Standings

Matches

References

External links

2019–20 in Qatari football
2019–20 in Russian football
February 2020 sports events in Asia